Baganuur (Little Lake) is one of nine düüregs (districts) of the Mongolian capital of Ulaanbaatar. It is subdivided into six khoroos (subdistricts).

It was created as a Soviet army base for the 12th Motor Rifle Division.
Later the largest open-pit coal mine in Mongolia was built here. Baganuur city is one of the largest industrial production locations in Mongolia, especially coal mining and would rank among the country's ten largest cities. There are efforts under way to separate its administration from the capital to make it an independent city.

Transportation 
Baganuur is the endpoint of a side line of the Trans-Mongolian Railway, which connects to the main line in Bagakhangai. Due to high operation cost, Mongolian Railway had stopped passenger service on the Ulaanbaatar-Baganuur-Ulaanbaatar, although freight trains still normally transport coal to Ulaanbaatar and other neighbouring towns. 
Baganuur is also accessible via 138 km of paved road completed in 2004.

2008 methanol scare 
On December 31, 2007, Baganuur became the center of a massive methanol poisoning case that stemmed from substandard production methods of a local vodka manufacturer. The poison killed 14 people and hospitalized dozens of others. This case led to a complete ban of vodka sales in Ulaanbaatar for several days, and also highlighted one of Mongolia's food safety problems.

Climate
Baganuur has a dry-winter subarctic climate (Köppen Dwc).

References 

Districts of Ulaanbaatar
Populated places in Mongolia
Enclaves and exclaves